Ronald Robert Harper (born January 12, 1936) is an American television and movie actor. He resides in California.

Life and career
Harper was born in Turtle Creek, Pennsylvania, near Pittsburgh, the son of George Harper and Mabel Grace (Champion) Harper. After making straight A's at Turtle Creek High School, he went to Princeton University, where he was a member of the University Players. He was offered a fellowship to study law at Harvard but chose instead to study acting under Lee Strasberg.

After serving in the US Navy, Harper returned to New York. After several disappointments, he earned a job as Paul Newman's understudy in the Broadway play Sweet Bird of Youth in 1959. Relocating to Hollywood, his first role was in 1960 for the NBC television series Tales of Wells Fargo. Steady television guest appearances followed, including a role on NBC's series The Tall Man. In December 1960, he appeared in the episode "Duel at Parkison Town" of NBC's Laramie.

Harper appeared in soap operas, including CBS's series Where the Heart Is and Love of Life. He appeared as a regular performer for several television series, including Planet of the Apes, and as Uncle Jack for the third season of Land of the Lost. His movie credits included roles in Below Utopia (1997), The Odd Couple II (1998), Freedom Strike (1998), Glass Trap (2005) and The Poughkeepsie Tapes (2007).

Television series

87th Precinct (1961–1962), a police drama with Robert Lansing
Wendy and Me (1964–1965), a comedy with George Burns, Connie Stevens, J. Pat O'Malley, and James T. Callahan.
The Jean Arthur Show (1966), a comedy, as Paul Marshall, the son of fictitious attorney Patricia Marshall, played by Jean Arthur.
Garrison's Gorillas (1967–1968), a World War II drama series.
Planet of the Apes (1974) as Alan Virdon, one of the astronauts.
Land of the Lost (third season, 1976) as Uncle Jack Marshall.
Loving a soap opera, as Charles Hartman (1988).
Capitol a soap opera, as Jarret Morgan/Baxter Mccandless.
Generations, a soap opera, as Peter Whitmore (1990–1991).

References

External links

 
 
 Garrison's Gorillas website 
 Interview with Ron Harper, classicfilmtvcafe.com
 Ron Harper(Aveleyman)

1936 births
Living people
People from Turtle Creek, Pennsylvania
Male actors from Pennsylvania
American male film actors
American male soap opera actors
American male stage actors
American male television actors
Princeton University alumni